Matthew James MacNally (1873–1943) was a well known Australian watercolourist during the first half of the twentieth century. Since his death there have been two major exhibitions of his work, one at John Martin's Art Gallery in Adelaide (1946) and a retrospective at the Benalla Art Gallery (1974).

References 

Silas Clifford-Smith, 'James MacNally and the blotting paper school of landscape', Australiana (journal of the Australiana Society), February 2008, pp 14–20.

Silas Clifford-Smith, '', Dictionary of Australian Art Online, University of NSW, Sydney, 2008

Harry Julius, 'M.J. MacNally', Art in Australia, Sydney, NSW, 1918

1873 births
1943 deaths
20th-century Australian painters